San Juan Bautista Coixtlahuaca is a small town and municipality located in the Mixteca Region of the State of Oaxaca, Mexico, and the center of the Coixtlahuaca district.  The name, "Coixtlahuaca" means 'plain of snakes' in the Nahuatl language.

Town
The town was founded by the Chocholtecs in 37 AD.  Their last emperor was Atonaltzin, who fought against the Mexicas.  Two times he was defeated, the second and last time by Moctezuma II, who conquered much of this area.

It is located in the northeast part of the state of Oaxaca, 2,100 meters above sea level near the Cuacnopalan-Oaxaca highway.
Its main attraction is the Iglesia de San Juan Bautista (Church of Saint John the Baptist).  Completed in 1576, it is of Renaissance style with rose windows, sculptures, and a main entrance with dozens of recesses.  It also has a Baroque-style altarpiece (retablo).

Municipality

As municipal seat, San Juan Bautista Coixtlahuaca has governing jurisdiction over the following communities:

Barrio de Magdalena, Boca de Perro, Carrizal, Cerro de Agua (Tercera Sección), Cerro el Águila, Cuesta Blanca, El Cachuche, El Capulín (Sección Primera), El Guajolote, El Portezuelo, El Sotol, El Tepozán (Sección Segunda), El Zapato, El Zapotal (Sección Tercera), Estancia, Ixcate, Jazmín Río Poblano, La Ciénega, La Cruz, La Mulata, Laguna Seca, Narrege, Río Blanco, Río Poblano, San Jerónimo Otla, Santa Catarina Ocotlán, Sección Cuarta (Los Rodríguez), Tecamachalco, Tronco del Río and Zacate Amarillo

References

External links
 Santos in Oaxaca's Ancient Churches: Coixtlahuaca - Art-historical study of the statues in the Church of San Juan Bautista in Coixtlahuaca

Municipalities of Oaxaca
37 establishments